Ursula Tyrwhitt (1872–1966) was an English painter and draughtsman.

Biography
Ursula Tyrwhitt was born in Nazeing, Essex and studied at the Slade School of Fine Art from 1893 to 1894 and also in 1911 and 1912. She also studied in Paris at the Académie Colarossi and in Rome at the British Academy.
Tyrwhitt was a close friend of Gwen John and her brother Augustus Edwin John and is the subject of a 1903 etching by him held by the National Portrait Gallery, London. John also made a chalk drawing of her with Gwen John and Ida Nettleship (his first wife) which is held by the Yale Center for British Art in the Paul Mellon Collection.

Tyrwhitt exhibited with the New English Art Club and became a member in 1913. Examples of her work are displayed in The National Library of Wales, the Tate Gallery and in the British Council collection. The Ashmolean Museum held a retrospective exhibition in 1973 entitled Ursula Tyrwhitt, Oxford painter and collector 1872–1966.

Tyrwhitt married her cousin, the artist Walter Tyrwhitt (1859–1932). She lived in Puerto de la Cruz, Tenerife and also in Oxford, where she died in 1966.

Further reading
 Richard Buckle. Ursula Tyrwhitt: Oxford Painter and Collector. Ashmolean Museum, 1974,

References

External links

1872 births
1966 deaths
20th-century English painters
20th-century English women artists
Académie Colarossi alumni
Alumni of the Slade School of Fine Art
English women painters
People from Essex